This is a list of academic journals on health care.

General 
Health Affairs
Health and Human Rights
Human Resources for Health
Health Service Journal
Journal of Health Management
Journal of Communication in Healthcare
Milbank Quarterly

Epidemiology
American Journal of Epidemiology
Clinical Epidemiology
Epidemiology
European Journal of Epidemiology
Journal of Clinical Epidemiology
Journal of Epidemiology and Community Health

Global health
Bulletin of the World Health Organization
African Journal of Health Sciences
Eastern Mediterranean Health Journal
Global Health Action

Healthcare economics
Health Economics

Healthcare ethics
Clinical Ethics
Patient Preference and Adherence

Healthcare systems
Health Services Management Research
Human Resources for Health
Journal for Healthcare Quality
Journal of Healthcare Management
Journal of Innovation in Health Informatics
Journal of Medical Marketing

Medicine

Nursing

Pharmacy
Pharmacotherapy
The Annals of Pharmacotherapy
The American Journal of Health-System Pharmacy

Physical Therapy
British Journal of Occupational Therapy
Canadian Journal of Occupational Therapy
Critical Reviews in Physical and Rehabilitation Medicine

Psychiatry

See also
List of medical journals
Medical literature

Health care
 
Healthcare j